Daisuke Ronald Ssegwanyi (born 11 March 1993) is a Ugandan swimmer.

Career
Ssegwanyi first competed for Uganda at the 2010 Commonwealth Games in Delhi, where he finished 22nd in the 50 metre breaststroke in 34.65, 26th in the 100 metre breaststroke in 1:20.28, 46th in the 100 metre freestyle in 1:04.41 and 56th in the 50 metre freestyle in 28.60.

At the 2010 FINA World Swimming Championships (25 m) in Dubai, Ssegwanyi finished 80th in the 100 metre breaststroke in 1:19.25, 80th in the 50 metre breaststroke in 34.45, 110th in the 50 metre freestyle in 27.21 and 111th in the 100 metre freestyle in 1:01.72.

References

1993 births
Living people
Ugandan male swimmers
Male breaststroke swimmers
Ugandan male freestyle swimmers
Commonwealth Games competitors for Uganda
Swimmers at the 2010 Commonwealth Games
20th-century Ugandan people
21st-century Ugandan people